Paperback Hero may refer to:

 Paperback Hero (1973 film), a 1973 Canadian film
 Paperback Hero (1999 film), a 1999 Australian film
 "Paperback Hero!", a 1988 episode of The Raccoons